Jacob Borden (born December 10, 1998) is a United States Virgin Islands international soccer player who plays as a midfielder.

Career statistics

International

References

External links
 
 Jacob Borden at CaribbeanFootballDatabase
 Indiana Wesleyan bio

1998 births
Living people
United States Virgin Islands soccer players
United States Virgin Islands international soccer players
Association football midfielders
Indiana Wesleyan Wildcats men's soccer players
Montverde Academy alumni